A square mile is a unit of area equal to the area of a square of one mile in length on each side.  

Square mile may also refer to:

Places
A day-to-day name for a section of a survey township
The City of London, nicknamed the "Square Mile", being about a square mile in area
Adelaide city centre in South Australia, nicknamed the "Square Mile", in imitation of the City of London
Square Mile, South Australia, a locality in the local government area of the District Council of Grant
"Square Mile" or Golden Square Mile, a historic area in downtown Montreal
The Antwerp diamond district, an area within the city of Antwerp, Belgium

Other uses
Square Mile (magazine), a magazine marketed to City of London bankers
Square Mile (board game), land development game released by Milton Bradley Company in 1962

See also

 square kilometre
 hectare
 acre
 
 
 Mile square (disambiguation)
 Square (disambiguation)
 Mile (disambiguation)